James Keith Milligan (born 24 August 1978) is an Australian politician. He was a Liberal member of the Australian Capital Territory Legislative Assembly from 2016 to 2020, representing the electorate of Yerrabi. He ran a graphic design publishing business before his election, and was communications director of the Gungahlin Community Council.

Milligan was defeated at the 2020 ACT election, losing his seat to fellow Liberal Leanne Castley, however he was re-elected in March 2021 in a countback of votes to fill a casual vacancy caused by the resignation of former Liberal leader Alistair Coe.

References

1978 births
Living people
Liberal Party of Australia members of the Australian Capital Territory Legislative Assembly
Members of the Australian Capital Territory Legislative Assembly
21st-century Australian politicians